Oceanisphaera litoralis is a Gram-negative, aerobic and moderately halophilic bacterium from the genus of Oceanisphaera which has been isolated from sediments from the Sea of Japan in Russia.

References 

Aeromonadales
Bacteria described in 2003